was a town located in Higashiusuki District, Miyazaki Prefecture, Japan.

As of 2003, the town had an estimated population of 4,684 and the density of 16.73 persons per km². The total area was 279.91 km².

On March 31, 2007, Kitagawa was merged into the expanded city of Nobeoka and no longer exists as an independent municipality.

External links
Nobeoka official website 

Dissolved municipalities of Miyazaki Prefecture